Sandra Szabóová (born 22 July 1996) is a Slovak female volleyball player. She is part of the Slovakia women's national volleyball team. She competed at the 2019 Women's European Volleyball Championship.

Clubs
  VK Komárno (none–2013)
  Slávia EU Bratislava (2013–2018)
  SC Potsdam (2018–2019)
  Volley-Ball Club Chamaliéres (2019–present)

References

External links 

 Volleyball-Bundesliga (VBL)
 Profile on CEV

1993 births
Living people
Slovak women's volleyball players
Slovak expatriate sportspeople in Germany
Slovak expatriate sportspeople in France
Sportspeople from Komárno